Alon Harris, MS, PhD, FARVO is an internationally-active clinical scientist, professor of ophthalmology, educator, inventor and researcher in the field of ocular blood flow and its relationship to diseases of the eye. Harris served as the principal or co-principal investigator on more than 60 research grants, published more than 368 peer-reviewed articles, and wrote 22 books and 69 book chapters. As of 2021, he holds two patents. Harris sits on the Board of Directors of The Glaucoma Foundation and is the Vice Chair of International Research and Academic Affairs and Director of the Ophthalmic Vascular Diagnostic and Research Program at Icahn School of Medicine at Mount Sinai.

Career and education 
Harris's post-doctorate training in medical science physiology was at Indiana University in 1990. He received an MS in 1985 and PhD in 1988 in human performance/physiology. Subsequently he took positions at Indiana University School of Medicine, including the Lois Letzter Endowed Chair in Ophthalmology, Professor of Ophthalmology, Professor of Cellular and Integrative Physiology, and Director, Glaucoma Research and Diagnostic Center, Department of Ophthalmology. He served as Director of Clinical Research at the Glick Eye Institute. Harris was co-chair, World Glaucoma Congress Consensus on Ocular Blood Flow, and was a member of the international faculty board of the PhD program in Experimental Medicine, University of Pavia.

Research 
Harris's clinical research focus includes: ocular blood flow; glaucoma; intraocular pressure and hemodynamics related to eye disorders; ophthalmic risk factor assessment; structural and functional progression monitoring; non-evasive imaging of diseases such as glaucoma; brain and eye physiology; modeling for factors that increase or decrease disease susceptibilities in terms of race, gender, and conditions such as diabetes.
 
In collaboration with mathematicians, Harris uses modeling and artificial intelligence applications to increase precision of diagnostics and disease management.

Grants 
Harris has multiyear support from the National Science Foundation, grants from the NIH, American Diabetes Association and National Eye Institute. As of 2020, he has served as co-investigator or principal investigator (PI) on more than 60 grants related to ocular vascular physiology. He was co-PI on The Thessaloniki Eye Study, reportedly ophthalmology's largest population-based study.

Patents 
Harris is co-inventor on an international patent application, Methods and systems for patient specific identification and assessment of ocular disease risk factors and treatment efficacy,
 
He developed and generated data for two patents: "Treatment of Macular Edema" and "Method to increase retinal and optical nerve head blood flow velocity in order to preserve sight."

Publications

Editorial boards 
Harris is the founder and co-editor of Modeling and Artificial Intelligence in Ophthalmology (formerly Journal of Modeling in Ophthalmology). As of 2020, he is also on the board of the Journal of Ophthalmology, Acta Ophthalmologica Scandinavica, Journal of Glaucoma, and PLOS ONE.

Books and book chapters 
Partial list:
 Ocular blood flow in glaucoma, World Glaucoma Association Consensus Series 6 (Kugler Publications, Amsterdam, the Netherlands. 2009. 
 Optic nerve blood flow measurement. Ophthalmology: Fifth Edition 
 Ocular Fluid Dynamics: Anatomy, Physiology, Imaging Techniques, and Mathematical Modeling (Modeling and Simulation in Science, Engineering and Technology) Author: Giovanna Guidoboni (Editor), Alon Harris (Editor), Riccardo Sacco (Editor) Nov 26, 2019 
 Biophysical Properties in Glaucoma: Diagnostic Technologies Author: Ingrida Januleviciene (Editor), Alon Harris (Editor) Nov 13, 2018 
 Atlas of Ocular Blood Flow: Vascular Anatomy, Pathophysiology, and Metabolism Author: Alon Harris MSc PhD Apr 07, 2010 2nd Edition 
 Retina and Optic Nerve Imaging Author: Thomas A. Ciulla (Editor), Carl D. Regillo (Editor), Alon Harris (Editor) Aug 25, 2003 1st Edition 
 Atlas of Ocular Blood Flow: Vascular Anatomy, Pathophysiology, and Metabolism Author: Alon Harris MSc PhD, Christian Jonescu-Cuypers PhD MD, Larry Kagemann MS BME Aug 08, 2003 1st Edition 
 Leki generyczne w okulistyce Author: Harris Alon

Peer-reviewed papers 
Google Scholar reports that Harris's publications are cited 17,247 times, that he has an h-index of 72 and an i10-index of 270.
 
Partial list of peer-reviewed papers:
 
 Ocular blood flow as a clinical observation: Value, limitations and data analysis; Alon Harris, Giovanna Guidoboni, Brent Siesky, Sunu Mathew, Alice C Verticchio Vercellin, Lucas Rowe, Julia Arciero, Prog Retin Eye Res 2020 Jan 24;100841 
 Intraocular pressure, blood pressure, and retinal blood flow autoregulation: a mathematical model to clarify their relationship and clinical relevance; Guidoboni G, Harris A, Cassani S, Arciero J, Siesky B, Amireskandari A, Tobe L, Egan P, Januleviciene I, Park J.  Invest Ophthalmol Vis Sci. 2014 May 29;55(7):4105-18. doi: 10.1167/iovs.13-13611. Invest Ophthalmol Vis Sci. 2015 Oct;56(11):6247. 
 Color Doppler analysis of ocular vessel blood velocity in normal-tension glaucoma; A Harris, RC Sergott, GL Spaeth, JL Katz… - American journal of ophthalmology, 1994 Cited by 392 related articles
 Starvation and diabetes increase the amount of pyruvate dehydrogenase kinase isoenzyme 4 in rat heart; P Wu, J Sato, Y Zhao, J Jaskiewicz, MK POPOV… - Biochemical Journal, 1998 Cited by 318 related articles
 Color Doppler ultrasound imaging of theeye and orbit; TH Williamson, A Harris - Survey of ophthalmology, 1996  Cited by 294 related articles
 Automatic retinal oximetry; SH Hardarson, A Harris, RA Karlsson, GH Halldorsson… - Investigative ophthalmology & visual science, 2006  Cited by 262 related articles
 Ginkgo biloba extract increases ocular blood flow velocity; HS Chung, A Harris, JK Kristinsson, TA Ciulla… - Journal of ocular pharmacology and therapeutics, 1999  Cited by 220 related articles
 Vascular aspects in the pathophysiology of glaucomatous optic neuropathy; HS Chung, A Harris, DW Evans, L Kagemann… - Survey of ophthalmology,1999 Cited by 209 related articles

Memberships and awards 
Partial list of awards:
 
 The Bruno Boles Carenini Lecture Award, Italian Association for the Study of Glaucoma (AISG) – 2020  
 Glenn W. Irwin Jr., MD., Experience Excellence Recognition Award –  2002
 William and Mary Greve International Research Scholar Award from the Research to Prevent Blindness organization – 1995
 American Academy of Ophthalmology Achievement Award – 2001
 Edmund Benjamin Spaeth Oration Award for Outstanding Clinical Research – 1995
 
As of 2020, memberships include:
 
 2019–present: Member, The New York Glaucoma Society
 Co-chair, the 2009 World Glaucoma Association Consensus
 2008–present: Founding Charter Member, Von Graefe Society
 2008: Subcommittee on Blood Flow in Glaucoma Member, World Glaucoma Association
 2000–present: Honorary Member, Greek Glaucoma Society
 2000–present: Honorary Member, Lithuanian Glaucoma Society
 2000–present: Member, Israeli Glaucoma Society
 1996–present: Member, American Glaucoma Society
 1995–present: Fellow, American Society for Laser Medicine and Surgery, Inc.
 1993–present: Member, International Society of Spaeth Fellows
 1992–present: Member, Association for Research in Vision and Ophthalmology

See also 

 Eyes
 New York Eye and Ear Infirmary
 Icahn School of Medicine at Mount Sinai

References

External links 
 The silent thief: Faculty member warns of glaucoma, shares research hopes, Indiana University
 Mount Sinai Medical Center homepage

Living people
Year of birth missing (living people)
Ophthalmologists
Icahn School of Medicine at Mount Sinai faculty
Academic staff of the University of Pavia
Indiana University School of Medicine faculty